Dawei Airport  is an airport serving Dawei (formerly known as Tavoy), a city in the Tanintharyi Division in southeastern Myanmar.

Facilities

Airlines and destinations

References

External links
 
https://dlca.logcluster.org/plugins/servlet/mobile?contentId=852781#content/view/852781

Airports in Myanmar
Tanintharyi Region